Neodymium-doped yttrium lithium fluoride (Nd:YLF) is a lasing medium for arc lamp-pumped and diode-pumped solid-state lasers. The YLF crystal (LiYF4) is naturally birefringent, and commonly used laser transitions occur at 1047 nm and 1053 nm.

It is used in Q-switched systems in part due 
to its relatively long fluorescence lifetime.
As with Nd:YAG lasers, harmonic generation is frequently 
employed with Q-switched Nd:YLF 
to produce shorter wavelengths. A common application
of frequency-doubled Nd:YLF pulses is to pump ultrafast 
Ti:Sapphire chirped-pulse amplifiers.

Neodymium-doped YLF can provide higher pulse energies than Nd:YAG for repetition rates of a few kHz or less. Compared to Nd:YAG, the Nd:YLF crystal is very brittle 
and fractures easily. It is also slightly water-soluble — a YLF laser rod may very 
slowly dissolve in cooling water which surrounds it.

See also 
Neodymium doped yttrium orthovanadate (Nd:YVO4)
Neodymium doped yttrium aluminum garnet (Nd:YAG) laser

References

Laser gain media
Crystals
Neodymium compounds
Yttrium compounds
Lithium compounds
Fluorides